The 1980 San Jose State Spartans football team represented San Jose State University during the 1980 NCAA Division I-A football season as a member of the Pacific Coast Athletic Association. The team was led by head coach Jack Elway, in his second year at San Jose State, and the team played home games at Spartan Stadium in San Jose, California. The Spartans finished the 1980 season with a record of seven wins and four losses (7–4, 3–2 PCAA).

Schedule

Team players in the NFL
The following were selected in the 1981 NFL Draft.

The following finished their college career in 1980, were not drafted, but played in the NFL.

Notes

References

External links
 Game program: San Jose State vs. Washington State at Spokane – September 13, 1980

San Jose State
San Jose State Spartans football seasons
San Jose State Spartans football